The 2002–03 Wagner Seahawks men's basketball team represented Wagner College during the 2002–03 NCAA Division I men's basketball season. The Seahawks are led by fourth-year head coach Dereck Whittenburg. They played their home games at Spiro Sports Center on the school's Staten Island campus as members of the Northeast Conference. Wagner finished on top of the NEC regular season standings, won the NEC tournament, and received an automatic bid to the NCAA tournament. Making the program's first appearance in the "Big Dance," and playing as the No. 15 seed in the East region, the Seahawks were beaten by No. 2 seed Pittsburgh in the opening round.

Roster

Source

Schedule and results

|-
!colspan=12 style=| Regular season

|-
!colspan=12 style=| NEC tournament

|-
!colspan=12 style=| NCAA tournament

|-

Source

References

Wagner Seahawks men's basketball seasons
Wagner Seahawks
Wagner
Wagner Seahawks men's basketball team
Wagner Seahawks men's basketball team